Sanah is a sub-district located in At Taffah District, Al Bayda Governorate, Yemen. Sanah had a population of 1131  according to the 2004 census.

References 

Sub-districts in At Taffah District